Alexander M. Anderson was a Scottish amateur footballer who played in the Scottish League for Queen's Park and Heart of Midlothian as an inside forward. He was capped by Scotland at amateur level.

References 

Year of birth missing
Place of birth missing
Association football inside forwards
Scottish footballers
Queen's Park F.C. players
Scottish Football League players
Scotland amateur international footballers
Petershill F.C. players
East Fife F.C. wartime guest players
Heart of Midlothian F.C. players